Khéphren Thuram-Ulien (born 26 March 2001) is a French professional footballer who plays as a midfielder for Ligue 1 club Nice and the France national football team.

Club career

Monaco 
Thuram made his professional debut with Monaco in a 2–0 UEFA Champions League loss away to Atlético Madrid on 28 November 2018, at the age of 17; he was a 63rd-minute substitute for Aleksandr Golovin.

Nice 
On 26 June 2019, Thuram joined Derby de la Côte d'Azur rivals Nice. He made his debut on 17 August in a 2–1 win at Nîmes, replacing Ignatius Ganago for the last seven minutes. On 3 October 2020, he scored his first professional goal to win a home match by the same score against Nantes.

International career
Thuram has represented France at various youth international levels.

In March 2023, he received his first call-up to the France senior national team for the UEFA Euro 2024 qualifying matches against the Netherlands and the Republic of Ireland.

Personal life
Thuram is the son of the former France international footballer Lilian Thuram, and the younger brother of the professional footballer Marcus Thuram. He was named after the Egyptian pharaoh Khephren.

Born in Reggio Emilia, Italy, he is of Guadeloupean descent through his father.

Career statistics

Club

Honours 
Nice

 Coupe de France runner-up: 2021–22

References

External links
 
 
 

2001 births
Living people
Sportspeople from Reggio Emilia
Association football midfielders
French footballers
France youth international footballers
French people of Guadeloupean descent
AC Boulogne-Billancourt players
AS Monaco FC players
OGC Nice players
Ligue 1 players
Championnat National 2 players
Championnat National 3 players
Thuram family
Footballers from Emilia-Romagna